Pillaiyarpatti may refer to:
 Karpaka Vinayakar Temple Karpaka Vinayagar Temple near Karaikudi
 Pillaiyarpatti, Thanjavur district village in Thanjavur